Roland Braun (born 1 May 1972) is a German former skier. He competed in the Nordic combined event at the 1994 Winter Olympics.

References

External links
 

1972 births
Living people
German male Nordic combined skiers
Olympic Nordic combined skiers of Germany
Nordic combined skiers at the 1994 Winter Olympics
People from Freudenstadt
Sportspeople from Karlsruhe (region)